Angsiduo Township (Mandarin: 昂思多镇) is a township in Hualong Hui Autonomous County, Haidong, Qinghai, China. In 2010, Angsiduo Township had a total population of 16,739: 8,354 males and 8,385 females: 4,584 aged under 14, 11,093 aged between 15 and 65 and 1,062 aged over 65.

References 

Township-level divisions of Qinghai
Haidong
Towns in China